Theodore Henry Schreiber (July 11, 1938 – September 8, 2022) was an American professional baseball player. He played part of one season in Major League Baseball — largely as a third baseman — with the New York Mets, batting .160 with no extra base hits in 50 at-bats, with two runs batted in.

Schreiber graduated from Brooklyn's James Madison High School and St. John's University. In  he signed his first professional contract with the Boston Red Sox, and he played four full seasons in Boston's farm system, culminating as the regular second baseman for the 1962 Seattle Rainiers of the Triple-A Pacific Coast League, where he batted .279 in 147 games. He was selected by the Mets in the Rule 5 draft on November 26, and spent the 1963 season with New York and its top farm club, the Buffalo Bisons of the International League. On September 18, 1963, Schreiber pinch hit for Larry Bearnarth in the bottom of the ninth inning; the Mets trailed the Philadelphia Phillies, 5–1. Facing left-hander Chris Short, Schreiber bounced into a double play, ending the game. In doing so, he became the last batter in the history of New York's venerable Polo Grounds stadium.

During the 1963 off-season, Schreiber was a temporary teacher with the New York City Board of Education, and had assignments at Montauk Junior H.S. 223 in Brooklyn.  After two more seasons in the IL, Schreiber retired after the 1965 campaign. He batted .260 with 36 home runs in 668 minor league games during his career.

Upon leaving baseball, Schreiber became a full-time teacher at a junior high school in Sunset Park, Brooklyn. He retired after 27 years at the school. He died September 8, 2022.

References

External links

1938 births
2022 deaths
Allentown Red Sox players
Baseball players from New York (state)
Buffalo Bisons (minor league) players
Johnstown Red Sox players
James Madison High School (Brooklyn) alumni
Major League Baseball third basemen
Minneapolis Millers (baseball) players
New York Mets players
Sportspeople from Brooklyn
Baseball players from New York City
Rochester Red Wings players
St. John's Red Storm baseball players
St. John's University (New York City) alumni
Schoolteachers from New York (state)
Seattle Rainiers players
Waterloo Hawks (baseball) players